The National Institute of Dental and Craniofacial Research (NIDCR) is a branch of the U.S. National Institutes of Health. The institute aims to improve the oral, dental, and craniofacial health through research and the distribution of important health information to the American people.

History 
In 1931, the United States Public Health Service established a Dental Hygiene Unit at the National Institutes of Health. Designated as the first dental research worker, Dr. H. Trendley Dean studied the communities affected by the oral disease known as mottled enamel. Following the implementation of a water fluoridation trial in Grand Rapids, Michigan, the National Institute of Dental Research (NIDR), was established by President Harry S. Truman on June 24, 1948. The first grants and fellowships that supported dental research were awarded the following year.

In an effort to expand the NIDR, plans to finance the construction of a building for the institute were approved by President Dwight D. Eisenhower in 1958. The National Institute of Dental Research also established the Laboratory of Biochemistry to further the research regarding the structure and functions of various proteins. In continuing with this expansion, a grant to develop several dental research facilities at various universities was approved in 1967. This program hoped to establish research and training environments, as well as promote interdisciplinary approaches to combating oral diseases.
 
In addition to the Laboratory of Biochemistry, other laboratories were established in the years 1974 and 1975. These newly established laboratories focused on the field of oral medicine as well as the fields of microbiology and immunology. Another effort to expand research was implemented a decade later. The Dentist Scientist Award Program aimed to provide dentists with opportunities and incentive to pursue independent research regarding oral health.

In 1986, the most extensive survey on the dental health of American adults was completed by the NIDR. This study was the first to examine oral health diseases on a large and detailed scale. 
Following this survey, in 1993, the National Oral Health Information Clearinghouse was established. The purpose of this database is to provide resources for health professionals, patients, and the general public regarding oral health. In continuing with its mission to distribute important health information, the NIDR launched its official website in 1996.

Following its 50th anniversary, the NIDR changed its name to the National Institute of Dental and Craniofacial Research (NIDCR).

In 2001, the NIDCR released its revamped plan to eliminate oral health disparities across the United States. The institute followed up with this plan by establishing five new Centers for Research to Reduce Oral Health Disparities.
 
A decade later, Martha J. Somerman was appointed as the eighth director of the NIDCR. Through nurturing fundamental research and the development of researchers, the NIDCR aims to promote health, to prevent diseases and conditions, and to develop new diagnostics and therapeutics.

In 2020, Rena D'Souza was selected as the NIDCR's ninth director, replacing Martha Somerman, who had served from 2011 to 2020. D'Souza's tenure as Director began in October 2020 and Jennifer Webster-Cyriaque became the deputy director later that year.

Directors

Notes and references

External links 
 National Institute of Dental and Craniofacial Research 
 Dental, Oral, and Craniofacial Data Resource Center 
 NIDCR Official Twitter 

Dental and Craniofacial Research
Dental organizations based in the United States
Research institutes established in 1931
Government agencies established in 1931
1931 establishments in the United States
Medical research institutes in Maryland